Eugene Gregory Bernard McGinley (July 31, 1935 – July 16, 2019) was a politician in the province of New Brunswick, Canada.  He was elected to the Legislative Assembly of New Brunswick in a 1972 by-election to represent the electoral district of Bathurst and was re-elected in 1974 following which he retired from politics.  He was re-elected in 2003 to represent the district of Grand Lake.

On February 6, 2007 he was elected speaker of the legislature defeating Tony Huntjens and Wally Stiles on the first ballot.  He resigned the speakership on October 31, 2007 to accept an appointment to the cabinet as Minister of State for Seniors and Housing. He was left out of cabinet following a November 2008 cabinet shuffle. McGinley did not reoffer in the 2010 election.

McGinley was educated at the University of New Brunswick and in Texas. He went on to practice law in Bathurst. McGinley was named Queen's Counsel in 1985.

References 

 MLA Bios, Government of New Brunswick

Living people
Lawyers in New Brunswick
Members of the Executive Council of New Brunswick
Speakers of the Legislative Assembly of New Brunswick
New Brunswick Liberal Association MLAs
1935 births
20th-century Canadian politicians
21st-century Canadian politicians